The Magpie River is a  river in the Côte-Nord region of Quebec which flows from the Labrador Plateau to empty into the north shore of the Saint Lawrence River east of Sept-Îles, Quebec.

Location

Two of its tributaries are named Magpie West and Magpie East.
The central section contains the long Lake Magpie
The river is not wide, but fast and turbulent.

Its estuary is wide and forms a harbour for fishing boats.
The site was visited from 1849 by Gaspesians from Chaleur Bay who came to fish for cod and Atlantic salmon. 
The village boomed after the fishing companies Robin & Colas and Le Bouthillier establish facilities there around 1870.

Name

The river is named for the Canada jay (Perisoreus canadensis), which the English called "magpie".
In the 19th century the local people pronounced in Magpointe.
In 1870 Eugène-Étienne Taché's map showed the river as "R. Magpie or La Pie".
In 1886 the surveyor Saint-Cyr called it Rivière à la Pie.
It is nicknamed La Pie.
According to the Abbé Victor-Alphonse Huard, it was also called Girard River after the three Girard brothers who settled in the area around 1849.
The Innu have called it by various names, including Moteskikan Hipu, meaning "abrupt", "rocky" or "difficult" river, Mutehekau Hipu which translates as "river where the water passes between the square rocky cliffs" and Pmotewsekaw Sipo which means "river along which one walks among the shrubs".

Description

According to the Dictionnaire des rivières et lacs de la province de Québec (1914),

Basin

It lies between the basins of the Jupitagon River to the west and the Saint-Jean River to the east.
It is partly in the unorganized territories of Lac-Jérôme and Rivière-Nipissis, partly in the municipality of Rivière-Saint-Jean.
It is bordered on each side by capes and mountains.
It is full of large pike.
A map of the ecological regions of Quebec shows the river in sub-regions 6j-T and 6m-T of the east spruce/moss subdomain.

Hydroelectric project

In 2004, a plan by a private company to construct a small hydroelectric plant on the river generated protests by environmentalists, including Robert F. Kennedy Jr.
The Bureau of Public Hearings on the Environment (BAPE) gave a favorable report on the project in 2004, but said there should be no further development on the river.
In August 2005 the Charest government authorized construction of the dam by decree, which would eliminate some famous rapids.
The Magpie Generating Station was commissioned in October 2007.
It was formally inaugurated on 20 June 2008.
In its 2009–2013 strategic plan, Hydro-Québec was planning to build six hydroelectric dams on the Magpie.
However, in September 2017 the company stated that it had surplus capacity and at present had no plans for the river.

Recreational use

In May 2015 the Ministry of Forests, Wildlife and Parks of Quebec announced a sport fishing catch-and-release program for large salmon on sixteen of Quebec's 118 salmon rivers.
These were the Mitis, Laval, Pigou, Bouleau, aux Rochers, Jupitagon, Magpie, Saint-Jean, Corneille, Piashti, Watshishou, Little Watshishou, Nabisipi, Aguanish and Natashquan rivers.
The Quebec Atlantic Salmon Federation said that the measures did not go nearly far enough in protecting salmon for future generations.
In view of the rapidly declining Atlantic salmon population catch-and-release should have been implemented on all rivers apart from northern Quebec.

The river is popular with white-water rafting, canoeing and kayaking enthusiasts.
The lower section of the West Magpie provides  of challenging conditions for class IV – V whitewater kayak and open boat paddlers.
From there the river can be handled by most recreational kayakers.
The last  of the river flows through huge scenic gorges and over waterfalls.

Legal status of the river 
In February 2021, the Magpie River became the first river in Canada to be granted legal personhood, after the local municipality of Minganie and the Innu Council of Ekuanitshit passed joint resolutions.

References

Sources

Dictionnaire des rivières et lacs de la province de Québec, by Québec (Province). Département des terres et forêts; Rouillard, Eugène, 1851-1926; Government of Quebec, 1914

Rivers of Côte-Nord
Tributaries of the Saint Lawrence River